Cecil Eugene Jones (March 9, 1922 – July 30, 1960) was an American Negro league pitcher in the 1940s.

A native of Atlanta, Georgia, Jones pitched for the Homestead Grays during their 1943 Negro World Series championship season. He appeared in six games on the mound for the Grays in 1943, posting a 2–0 record with 16 strikeouts in 23.2 innings. Jones also played briefly for the Atlanta Black Crackers that season. He died in Atlanta in 1960 at age 38.

References

External links
 and Baseball-Reference Black Baseball stats and Seamheads

1922 births
1960 deaths
Atlanta Black Crackers players
Homestead Grays players
Baseball pitchers
Baseball players from Atlanta
20th-century African-American sportspeople
Granby Phillies players
American expatriate baseball players in Canada